The 2013 USL Pro season was the 27th season of third-division soccer in the United States, and is the third season of the United Soccer Leagues' (USL) PRO professional competition. The number of teams increased from eleven to thirteen with Phoenix FC and VSI Tampa Bay FC joining the league as expansion franchises.

Teams

Stadiums and Locations

Personnel and kits

Note: Flags indicate national team as has been defined under FIFA eligibility rules. Players may hold more than one non-FIFA nationality.

MLS–USL Pro Alliance

On January 23, 2013, USL Pro announced an alliance with Major League Soccer. For the 2013 season, four MLS teams will affiliate with USL Pro teams in lieu of participating in the MLS Reserve League system. These MLS clubs will loan at least four of their reserve players to their USL Pro affiliate club for development purposes.

All USL Pro teams played two matches each with the remaining MLS Reserve League teams. Those matches counted toward the USL Pro standings, giving each team a total of 26 games.

The following teams affiliated:

Sporting Kansas City — Orlando City
New England Revolution — Rochester Rhinos
D.C. United — Richmond Kickers
Philadelphia Union — Harrisburg City Islanders

USL Pro teams played MLS Reserve teams as listed below. Except for Antiqua Barracuda (who played two MLS reserve teams on the road), each set was a home-and-away arrangement.

Antiqua Barracuda — FC Dallas and San Jose Earthquakes
Charleston Battery — Houston Dynamo
Charlotte Eagles — Chicago Fire
Dayton Dutch Lions — Columbus Crew
Harrisburg City Islanders — Colorado Rapids
Los Angeles Blues — Los Angeles Galaxy
Orlando City — Seattle Sounders
Pittsburgh Riverhounds — Toronto FC
Phoenix FC — Real Salt Lake
Richmond Kickers — Vancouver Whitecaps
Rochester Rhinos — Montreal Impact
VSI Tampa Bay — Portland Timbers
Wilmington Hammerheads — New York Red Bulls

USL Pro teams compiled an 11 Win, 9 Tie and 6 Loss record against MLS Reserve Teams in 2013.

Player transfers
For full article, see List of USL Pro transfers 2013.

Managerial changes

League table

Results table

USL Pro published schedule and results.

Playoffs
The 2013 USL PRO Playoffs will include the top eight finishers in the table, with the quarterfinals (No. 1 vs. No. 8, No. 2 vs. No. 7, etc.) set for the weekend of August 23–25. The semifinals featuring the four remaining teams will be played the following weekend, with the 2013 USL PRO Championship set for the weekend of September 6–8. All playoff rounds feature a single-game knockout format and teams will not be re-seeded following each round.

Championship Game MVP: Dom Dwyer (ORL)

Statistical leaders

Top scorers

Source:

Top assists

Source:

|}

Top Goalkeepers
(Minimum of 1080 Minutes Played)

Source:

League awards

 Most Valuable Player:  José Angulo (PIT)
 Rookie of the Year: Nate Robinson (RIC)
 Defender of the Year:  Colin Falvey (CHB)
 Goalkeeper of the Year: Andrew Dykstra (RIC)
 Coach of the Year: Leigh Cowlishaw (RIC)

All-League Teams

First Team
F: José Angulo (PIT), Dom Dwyer (ORL), Sainey Touray (HAR)
M: Matt Dallman (PIT), Joseph Ngwenya (RIC), Jamie Watson (ORL)
D: Colin Falvey (CHB), Henry Kalungi (RIC),  Rob Valentino (ORL), William Yomby (RIC)
G: Andrew Dykstra (RIC)

Second Team
F: Gibson Bardsley (DAY), Matt Fondy (LAB), Lucky Mkosana (HAR)
M: Michael Azira (CHB), George Davis IV (LAB), Jorge Herrera (CHE)
D: Danny Earls (ROC), Josh Rife (TAM),  Andrew Marshall (PIT), Daniel Steres (WIL)
G: Nick Noble (HAR)

References

 
2013
3
USL
USL